Christopher Jonathan Hollins (born 20 March 1971) is an English journalist, presenter and TV personality.  Formerly a first-class cricketer, he is best known for being the sports correspondent for BBC Breakfast until 2012, and for winning Strictly Come Dancing 2009.

Hollins presented the BBC consumer rights series Watchdog from 2010 until 2015.

Early life
Hollins was born into a footballing family in Bromley, south London. His father is John Hollins, the former Chelsea, Arsenal, Queens Park Rangers and England footballer. His uncle David was a goalkeeper and played for Newcastle United as well as Wales, winning eleven caps.

Hollins was educated at Bickley Park School in Bromley and Tonbridge School, Durham University, Hild Bede College, and Keble College, Oxford.

Career

Sport
After leaving Tonbridge School in 1989, he played football for Charlton, Queens Park Rangers, and Aldershot Town. He then attended Durham University and subsequently Oxford University for whom he played first-class cricket and gained a blue.

Television
Hollins started his media career at London TV station Channel One TV, then owned by Associated Newspapers. He then moved to Sky Sports in 1994 followed by spells at GMTV, Meridian and Five TV.

Hollins joined BBC News in 1999, and has also reported for Grandstand and Football Focus. He joined BBC Breakfast in October 2005, replacing Rob Bonnet.

Hollins was the main sport presenter on Breakfast, presenting on Mondays–Thursdays until his final show on 21 March 2012 (he had decided not to make the move to Salford as the show was being relocated). He was also a regular male relief presenter during the week, standing in for main presenter Bill Turnbull. Hollins has reported from the 2002 World Cup in Japan, the 2010 World Cup, and America to cover The Masters golf in 2007.

In 2009, Hollins joined the presenting team of the BBC One antiques show Cash in the Attic.

In April 2010, Hollins co-presented The One Show for a week alongside Louise Minchin while regular hosts Adrian Chiles and Christine Bleakley were unavailable. Hollins returned to co-host an episode with Alex Jones in March 2016.

In September 2010, Hollins became a co-presenter on Watchdog. He later left following the 2015 series. In July 2011 Hollins became a co-presenter on BBC One's programme The Great British Weather.

Hollins and Matt Allwright presented three series of Food Inspectors, a factual programme which began airing on BBC One in February 2012. In 2016, Hollins co-presented the third series of Secret Britain alongside Ellie Harrison and Denise Lewis.

Strictly Come Dancing

Hollins won the 2009 series of Strictly Come Dancing with dance partner Ola Jordan, beating Ricky Whittle in the final. He consistently won the public vote throughout, despite losing the judges' vote 190 – 186 in the Final. Hollins and Jordan were the only pair in the competition never to face the "Dance Off"

Film
Hollins appeared in the 2007 film Run Fatboy Run as a marathon commentator alongside Denise Lewis.

Personal life
Hollins lives with his wife, Sarah Alexander.

Charity work
In 2008, Hollins became a patron of children's cancer charity CLIC Sargent. Chris Hollins is an ambassador for Gold Challenge, part of the official mass participation legacy programme for the London 2012 Games, and a supporter of WellChild.

Filmography
Television

Film

References

External links
 
 Chris Hollins appointed new Sports Presenter on BBC Breakfast BBC Press Office, 5 October 2005
Chris Hollins Breakfast Profile and Interview, BBC News, 24 October 2005
Chris Hollins on the Yesterday website

1971 births
Living people
Footballers from Bromley
People educated at Tonbridge School
Alumni of the College of St Hild and St Bede, Durham
Alumni of Keble College, Oxford
Oxford University cricketers
English cricketers
English footballers
Aldershot Town F.C. players
BBC newsreaders and journalists
Strictly Come Dancing winners
Association football midfielders